Events from the year 1730 in Great Britain.

Incumbents
 Monarch – George II
 Prime Minister – Robert Walpole (Whig)
 Parliament – 7th

Events
 3 February – The Daily Advertiser is founded in London as the first newspaper funded by advertising.
 12 March – John Glas deposed from the Church of Scotland; the Glasite sect forms around him.
 15 May – Walpole–Townshend ministry dissolved when Charles Townshend, 2nd Viscount Townshend resigns as Secretary of State for the Northern Department after a dispute with Robert Walpole.

Undated
 The population of the UK exceeds 10 million for the first time.
 Reputedly the last originally native roe deer in England is killed at Hexham, Northumberland.

Births
 9 January – John Scott of Amwell, Quaker poet and landscape gardener (died 1783)
 27 March – Thomas Tyrwhitt, classical scholar and critic (died 1786)
 16 April – Henry Clinton, general (died 1795)
 26 April – John Moore, Archbishop of Canterbury (died 1805)
 13 May – Charles Watson-Wentworth, 2nd Marquess of Rockingham, Prime Minister (died 1782)
 12 July – Josiah Wedgwood, pottery manufacturer and abolitionist (died 1795)
 1 August – Frederick Hervey, 4th Earl of Bristol, Anglican Bishop of Derry, art collector and philanthropist (died 1803)
 7 September – Elisabetta de Gambarini, composer (died 1765) 
 1 November – George Horne, bishop (died 1792)
 14 December – James Bruce, Scottish explorer of the Nile (died 1794)
 30 December – William Hamilton, diplomat and antiquary (died 1803)
 date unknown – John Murray, 4th Earl of Dunmore, Scottish peer and colonial governor in the Americas (died 1809)

Deaths
 1 January – Daniel Finch, 2nd Earl of Nottingham, politician (born 1647)
 13 May – Sir Justinian Isham, 4th Baronet, landowner and politician (born 1658)
 30 May – Arabella Churchill, mistress of King James II (born 1648)
 19 June – Thomas Trevor, 1st Baron Trevor, judge and politician (born 1658)
 9 September – Charles FitzRoy, 2nd Duke of Cleveland, courtier (born 1662)
 27 September – Laurence Eusden, poet laureate (born 1688)
 23 October – Anne Oldfield, actress (born 1683)

References

 
Years in Great Britain